C. carbonaria  may refer to:
 Cardiocondyla carbonaria, an ant species in the genus Cardiocondyla
 Cercomacra carbonaria, the Rio Branco antbird, a bird species found in Brazil and Guyana
 Cheilosia carbonaria, a hoverfly species found in Europe
 Crassispira carbonaria, a sea snail species

See also
 Carbonaria (disambiguation)